The 1907–08 season was the 16th in the history of the Western Football League.

Division One continued to be split into two sections of six clubs, reorganised from the previous season, with the winner of each section playing each other in a Championship decider. Southampton won Section A and Millwall won Section B, with Millwall winning the decider 1–0. Tottenham Hotspur left the league at the end of the season as they were elected to the Football League for 1908–09. All the member clubs of Division One also competed in the Southern League during this season. The Division Two champions were Bristol City Reserves.

Division One
Four new clubs joined Division One, which was increased from 12 to 14 clubs after Chelsea and Fulham left.
Brighton & Hove Albion
Crystal Palace
Leyton
Luton Town

Section A

Section B

Championship decider 
At the end of the season, the winners of the two sections played a match to decide the overall champions.

Division Two
Two new clubs joined Division Two, which was reduced from 10 to nine clubs after Trowbridge Town and 121st R.F.A. left the league, and Newport disbanded.
Kingswood Rovers
Weymouth

References

1907-08
1907–08 in English association football leagues